Steven E. Sukup (born November 4, 1956) is an American politician in the state of Iowa.

Sukup was born in Sheffield, Iowa and attended the Iowa State University. A Republican, he served in the Iowa House of Representatives from 1995 to 2003 (18th district)

References

1956 births
Living people
People from Franklin County, Iowa
Iowa State University
21st-century American engineers
Republican Party members of the Iowa House of Representatives